Union Montilienne Sportive Football, commonly known as UMS Montélimar, is a French association football club based in the commune of Montélimar, in the Drôme department of south-eastern France. The club plays its home matches at the Stade Alexandre Tropenas, which has a capacity of 3,500 spectators.

Founded on 26 June 1924, the club fields teams in a range of age groups; the men's senior team currently plays in the Division d'Honneur Rhône Alpes, the sixth tier of the French football league system, and spent three seasons in Division 2 between 1970 and 1973.

Honours
 Championnat de France Amateur Group Sud: 1968–69, 1969–70
 Division 4 Group H: 1978–79
 Division d'Honneur Rhône-Alpes: 1989–90
 Division d'Honneur Lyonnais: 1961–62

References

External links
 Official website

Association football clubs established in 1924
1924 establishments in France
Montélimar
Sport in Drôme
Football clubs in Auvergne-Rhône-Alpes